Manuel "Pantera" Montero (born November 20, 1991 in Buenos Aires) is a rugby union player who plays for the Toronto Arrows of Major League Rugby (MLR) and Argentina on the wing.

Montero previously played for the Jaguares in Super Rugby.

Playing career
Montero switched to rugby from basketball as a teenager, when his best friend Agustín José Fornonzini forced him to do so, claiming he would be an outstanding rugby player.

He was selected for the Argentina Under 20s side for the IRB Junior World Cup in 2010, a year later in 2011 he was the standout player for Argentina in the Under 20 World Cup scoring against Italy and setting up a try with a great individual effort. After a spell in the Argentina Sevens side, in 2012 he gained selection for the Pampas XV and made his Pumas debut later that year, scoring a hat trick in his second test against Brazil and scoring 5 tries in his 3 matches. In his first start against a top nation, he scored the match winning try to defeat France in Cordoba.

He was included in 's squad that debuted at the new 2012 Rugby Championship.

Montero is signed to play for  until 2017.

References

1991 births
Living people
Argentine rugby union players
Rugby union wings
Rugby union players from Buenos Aires
Argentina international rugby union players
Pampas XV players
Jaguares (Super Rugby) players
Pan American Games medalists in rugby sevens
Pan American Games silver medalists for Argentina
Rugby sevens players at the 2011 Pan American Games
Medalists at the 2011 Pan American Games
Yacare XV players
Toronto Arrows players